S59 may refer to:
 S59 (Long Island bus)
 S59 (New York City bus), serving Staten Island
 Dharawal language
 , a submarine of the Royal Australian Navy
 , a submarine of the Indian Navy
 S59: Refer to manufacturer/supplier for information on recovery/recycling, a safety phrase
 Savoia-Marchetti S.59, an Italian flying boat
 SIA Engineering Company, a Singaporean aerospace company
 Sikorsky S-59, an prototype American helicopter